The Ogilby Hills are a mountain range in Imperial County, California.

They are in the Lower Colorado River Valley and the Colorado Desert, near the Colorado River in the Cibola National Wildlife Refuge.

References 

Mountain ranges of the Lower Colorado River Valley
Wilderness areas within the Lower Colorado River Valley
Mountain ranges of the Colorado Desert
Protected areas of the Colorado Desert
Protected areas of Imperial County, California